Al-Husseiniya Sport Club, is an Iraqi football team based in Karbala, that plays in the Iraq Division Two.

Managerial history
 Fadhel Mahdi
 Ali Hassoun

See also 
 2018–19 Iraq FA Cup
 2019–20 Iraq FA Cup

References

External links
 Al-Husseiniya SC on Goalzz.com
 Iraq Clubs- Foundation Dates

1994 establishments in Iraq
Association football clubs established in 1994
Football clubs in Karbala